Kanbekovo (Qanbäk) is a rural locality (a selo) in Bogdanovsky Selsoviet, Miyakinsky District, Bashkortostan, Russia. The population was 483 as of 2010. There are 5 streets.

Geography 
Kanbekovo is located 18 km northwest of Kirgiz-Miyaki (the district's administrative centre) by road. Chiryashtamak is the nearest rural locality.

References 

Rural localities in Miyakinsky District